Martellus Demond Bennett (born March 10, 1987) is an American former professional football player who was a tight end in the National Football League (NFL) for 10 seasons. He played college football at Texas A&M and was selected by the Dallas Cowboys in the second round of the 2008 NFL Draft. Bennett was a member of five teams during his career, most notably the Chicago Bears, where he earned Pro Bowl honors, and the New England Patriots, where he was part of the Super Bowl-winning team in Super Bowl LI. After retiring, Bennett became a children's author and published books under his publication company The Imagination Agency. He is the younger brother of former defensive end Michael Bennett.

Early years

Martellus Bennett played football and basketball at Alief Taylor High School in Houston, Texas. He was a three-year starter and two-time All-District and All-Greater Houston selection at tight end. As a sophomore, he averaged 12.4 yards per catch. During his junior year, he grabbed 13 catches for 170 yards and two touchdowns. In his senior year, he caught a team-high of 42 catches for 487 yards and six touchdowns, earning first-team Class 5A all-state honors from the Texas Sports Writers Association. He also averaged 23 points and 8.2 rebounds per game as a senior in basketball. He played in the 2005 U.S. Army All-American Bowl.

As a college football prospect in his senior year of high school, Bennett was a five-star recruit, ranked by Rivals.com as the No. 1 tight end and No. 8 best player in the 2005 prospect class. He was recruited by Texas A&M, Duke, Kansas, LSU, Miami, Oklahoma, and Texas. Although originally committed to play for Miami, he chose to sign a National Letter of Intent to play for Texas A&M.

Bennett also had interest in playing professional basketball. So, after his senior season Bennett decided to declare for the 2005 NBA Draft. He did not hire an agent though, intending to go to college if he was not selected in the first round. NBA scouts informed him that it was unlikely he would, causing him to withdraw from the draft a few days prior. As a result, he decided to enroll in classes in the second summer session at Texas A&M.

College career
In his freshman season at Texas A&M University, he caught 18 passes for 162 yards and three touchdowns. In his sophomore season, he was named one of eight semifinalists for the John Mackey Award, given annually to the nation's top tight end, after making 38 catches for 497 yards and three touchdowns. On October 28, 2006, he caught a career-high of 133 yards and two touchdowns on five catches against Baylor. He was named the Mackey Award Player of the Week after the game. He finished his sophomore season with All-Big 12 Second-team honors. In his junior season, he made 49 receptions for 587 yards and four touchdowns. After his junior season, an NFL committee indicated to Bennett that he would be a first or second-round pick in the NFL Draft, so Bennett decided to skip his senior season and declare early for the draft.

In his three seasons at Texas A&M University, Bennett caught 105 passes for 1,246 yards and 10 touchdowns. His 105 receptions equal the school record of most receptions by a tight end. He only averaged 34.6 yards per game, though many felt that his head coach, Dennis Franchione, who ran a run-oriented offense, did not properly use his talent. After his sophomore season, Bennett recorded a rap song called "Throw Me The Ball, Coach," and made a remix with his teammates. He played with his brother, Michael Bennett, at Texas A&M from 2006-2008.

Bennett also played basketball for Texas A&M for two seasons under head coach Billy Gillispie, but decided to focus on football in January 2007. In the 2005–06 season, his first, he became the first Texas A&M athlete since 1969 to letter in both basketball and football. He played in 26 games his freshman season, averaging 1.9 points and 1.5 rebounds. In his sophomore season, before choosing football, he averaged 0.5 points and 0.5 rebounds.

Professional career

Pre-draft

At the 2008 NFL scouting combine, Bennett finished the 40-yard dash in 4.68 seconds, ranking seventh out of the eight tight ends in his group. He ranked third in the vertical jump (34 inches) and fifth in the broad jump (9–9). Along with 30 other prospects, he was invited to the Dallas Cowboys' Valley Ranch headquarters for a predraft visit on April 17–18, 2008.

A week prior to the draft, an Associated Press sportswriter critiqued Bennett's playing abilities as: "Played basketball for the Aggies as well, and has the athletic ability to be a nice red-zone target. Lack of speed means he’s not a deep threat, but once he improves his routes, his strength and size should make him an asset. Needs to improve zone recognition, too. Good, aggressive blocker."

Dallas Cowboys

2008 season
After trading former second-round draft choice Anthony Fasano, the Cowboys selected Bennett in the second round (61st overall) of the 2008 NFL Draft. According to Cowboys' owner Jerry Jones, Bennett was selected not because they needed a backup tight end, but to "add a new dimension" by being part of a two-tight-end offense. In the 2008 preseason, Bennett learned technique from tight end Jason Witten. During the preseason camps, the documentary series Hard Knocks initially portrayed Martellus as a lazy and unmotivated player. Although Bennett was initially having trouble learning the Cowboys' offense, he worked hard to improve, as later episodes of Hard Knocks showed.

He agreed to a four-year contract with the team on July 24. He was given the number-two tight end position over Tony Curtis. In Week 7 against the St. Louis Rams, he recorded his first career touchdown on a 34-yard pass from Brad Johnson. He finished his rookie season with 20 receptions for 283 yards and four touchdowns.

Before the start of his second season, the Cincinnati Bengals offered a future first-round draft choice in exchange for Bennett, but the Cowboys declined. In 2009, he regressed as a receiver, compiling only 15 catches for 159 yards and no touchdowns.

2010 season
In a January 2010 news conference following the season, Jerry Jones indicated that while Bennett had breakout potential, he needed to put in the focus to meet it. Still, it was a concern that he was being pushed in preseason for the backup job by John Phillips, until Phillips was lost for the season with an ACL tear. In 2010, Bennett recorded a then career-high 33 catches, but for only 260 yards and no touchdowns.

2011 season
During his time with the Cowboys, he sometimes brought attention to himself by making controversial quotes and YouTube videos. Raising some eyebrows with his "Black Olympics" video or his radio interview, where he stated that backup quarterback Jon Kitna deserved a chance to compete for the starting job, after filling in for the injured Tony Romo during the 2010 season. He had an injury-plagued preseason in 2011, with an injured hamstring and right high ankle strain, keeping him out of two of four preseason games and two regular-season games, finishing the year with 17 catches for 144 yards and no touchdowns.

Although he could never realize his playmaking potential as the second-string tight end behind Witten, he did develop as an excellent blocker. Before the start of the 2012 season, the Cowboys offered a similar free agent deal as the one he received from the New York Giants, but he decided to leave Dallas, to have the opportunity to start.

New York Giants
On March 14, 2012, he signed a one-year, $2.5 million contract with the Giants. After his weight ballooned to 295 pounds in the off season, when asked about his conditioning during an interview, he responded: "I'm stronger than I've ever been, I'm faster than I've ever been. I could run all day. I'm kind of like a black unicorn out there". In the regular season, he got his weight under control. In the season opener against the Dallas Cowboys, his former team, he recorded his first touchdown in several years.  He recorded 55 receptions for 626 yards and five touchdowns in his lone season with the Giants, while playing through different injuries.

Chicago Bears

2013 season
On March 12, Bennett signed a four-year deal with the Chicago Bears. In Week 2, against the Minnesota Vikings, Bennett recorded his first career multi-touchdown game in the 31–30 victory. He concluded the 2013 season with a career-high 65 receptions and 759 yards. The 65 receptions were tied for eighth in the league among tight ends, and the second-highest in team history, behind Mike Ditka's 75 in 1964. The 759 yards were tied for ninth in yards, while Bennett also tied for 12th in touchdowns among tight ends.

2014 season
On August 5, Bennett was suspended by the team after slamming teammate Kyle Fuller to the ground after Fuller had violently grabbed him by the helmet. Bennett was reinstated on August 10. In Week 4, against the Green Bay Packers, he recorded a career-high 134 yards in the 38–17 loss. In Week 14 against the Dallas Cowboys, Bennett recorded his 77th catch of the year, surpassing Mike Ditka for the most receptions by a tight end in Bears history. In the same game, he recorded a career-high 12 receptions for 84 yards and a touchdown. He finished the season with 90 receptions for 916 yards and six touchdowns.  On January 19, 2015, Bennett was named to the 2015 Pro Bowl, replacing New England Patriots tight end Rob Gronkowski.

2015 season
Bennett held out during the team's voluntary offseason program over a contract dispute, but reported to minicamp to avoid potential fines.
On November 22, Bennett injured his ribs during week 11's matchup against the Denver Broncos. Bennett was "limited" in practice on November 24, 2015. On November 25, the Bears announced that Bennett was ruled out of week 12's matchup against the Green Bay Packers. He returned to action in the overtime loss to the San Francisco 49ers, but had to leave the field after taking a hit in the third quarter and aggravating the injury, before returning to finish the game.
On December 9, he was placed on the injured reserve list. At the time, he was leading the team with 53 receptions, but only had 439 receiving yards (ranking third on the team).

Bennett's relationship with his teammates, coaches, and general manager deteriorated through the 2015 season. Bennett voiced displeasure about his tenure with the Bears. He openly criticized Jay Cutler's on-field play in an interview with ESPN The Magazine, claiming "I’d be open and he’d throw into double coverage". He later derided his ex-teammates' morale and work ethic by calling them "a bunch of bitches" in an interview with E:60.

Adam Gase, Bennett's former offensive coordinator in Chicago, described coaching him, “The challenges Marty always brought for me was he’s very intelligent, and he asks a lot of very good questions.”

New England Patriots
On March 16, 2016, Bennett was traded along with a sixth-round draft pick (#204-Jordan Lucas) in the 2016 NFL Draft to the New England Patriots in exchange for a fourth-round pick (#127-Deiondre' Hall) in the 2016 NFL Draft . It was reported in the media that the Patriots were trying to recreate the success they experienced with the two-tight end offense that employed the Rob Gronkowski–Aaron Hernandez tandem in 2011 and 2012.

In his first five weeks, Bennett was the most efficient Patriots receiver on the field with 21 receptions for 314 yards and four touchdowns, including a three-touchdown effort in Tom Brady's return in Week 5 against the Cleveland Browns.

After Gronkowski was placed on the injured reserve list in early December, Bennett became the Patriots No. 1 tight end. He finished the regular season playing in all 16 games with 12 starts recording 55 receptions for 701 yards and a career-high seven touchdowns. His 397 yards after the catch ranked No. 2 among NFL tight ends in 2016. During the season, he was forced to play hurt, while battling ankle and shoulder injuries, which required him to undergo offseason ankle surgery to repair a cracked bone.

In the Patriots' Divisional Round win over the Houston Texans, he injured his left knee in the fourth quarter, which would be another injury he would have to wait to deal with until the end of the playoffs.

On February 5, 2017, Bennett was part of the Patriots team that won Super Bowl LI. In the game, he recorded five catches for 62 yards as the Patriots defeated the Atlanta Falcons by a score of 34–28 in overtime. In overtime, he drew a pass interference penalty in the end zone, giving the Patriots the ball at the two-yard line, setting up James White's touchdown run two plays later. The Patriots had trailed 28–3 in the third quarter, but rallied to win the game. The game marked the first overtime and the largest comeback in Super Bowl history.

Green Bay Packers
On March 10, 2017, Bennett signed with the Green Bay Packers on a three-year, $21 million contract after the team was unable to reach an agreement with Jared Cook, who left for the Oakland Raiders. On September 10, in his Packers debut, Bennett had three receptions for 43 yards in a 17–9 victory over the Seattle Seahawks. He was waived by the Packers on November 8, 2017, citing a failure to disclose a medical condition designation.

New England Patriots (second stint)
On November 9, 2017, Bennett was claimed off waivers by the New England Patriots. On November 10, just a day after being claimed, it was revealed that he was diagnosed with tears in both the rotator cuff and labrum in his shoulder, requiring Bennett to undergo a physical before he could legitimately join the team. Bennett claimed that the Packers had lied about his failure to disclose the injuries, and was active for his first game back with the Patriots, on November 12 against the Denver Broncos. On November 27, 2017, the Patriots placed Bennett on injured reserve due to shoulder and hamstring injuries. Without Bennett the Patriots reached Super Bowl LII, but the team lost 41-33 to the Philadelphia Eagles.

On March 7, 2018, Bennett was released by the Patriots.

Retirement

On March 23, 2018, Bennett announced his retirement from the NFL to focus on his multimedia production company.

NFL career statistics

Regular season

Postseason

Other ventures
In early 2014, Bennett told his Twitter followers that his first album was on iTunes. The album, Fast Food, a joint effort with his brother Reshaud Bennett, was originally released in March 2012. Bennett says he has plans to rerelease it in the summer of 2014. On February 7, 2014, Bennett released a new mixtape for free through his Twitter account called Year of the Orange Dinosaur.

During 2014, Bennett announced plans to release an animated short film titled Zoovie. The film, starring Bennett, rapper Asher Roth, and ESPN personality Cari Champion, was aired during the Bears' Family Fest in 2015; Bennett himself provided the sketches and storyboards.

He is also a children's author, and released his first book Hey A.J. It's Saturday in 2016 through his own company, The Imagination Agency.

Personal life
Bennett is the younger brother of former NFL defensive end Michael Bennett. He is also a friend of former Buffalo Bills tight end Kevin Everett. After Everett's career-ending neck injury in 2007, Bennett chose to honor Everett by wearing his jersey number for two games during his 2007 junior season at Texas A&M.

He is also known for his sense of humor. As a Fort Worth Star-Telegram reporter put it, Bennett "had more memorable quotes than memorable catches at Texas A&M". After being drafted by the Cowboys, Bennett stated, when referring to incumbent quarterback Tony Romo: "Any quarterback that can get Jessica Simpson, I’ve got to play with him". The Cowboys addressed his comment shortly afterwards. During an interview at the NFL combine, when asked about his interest in both basketball and football, he responded: "Football is my wife and basketball is my mistress".

In January 2009, Bennett was fined $22,000 for an explicit rap song he posted on YouTube.

References

External links

Official website
College career statistics

1987 births
Living people
African-American players of American football
American football tight ends
Chicago Bears players
Dallas Cowboys players
Green Bay Packers players
New England Patriots players
New York Giants players
Players of American football from Houston
Texas A&M Aggies football players
Unconferenced Pro Bowl players
21st-century African-American sportspeople
20th-century African-American people